Waldo is a masculine given name. It derives from the Anglo-Saxon name Waltheof, and may refer to:

People
 Waldo of Reichenau (740–814), Carolingian abbot and bishop
 Waldo Colburn (1824–1885), American politician
 Waldo A. Evans (1869–1936), American naval captain and military governor
 Waldo Frank (1889–1967), American novelist, historian, and critic
 Waldo Grant (born 1946), American serial killer
 Waldo E. Harder (1918–1976), president of Grace University
 M. Waldo Hatler (1894–1967), American soldier and Medal of Honor recipient
 Waldo Hutchins (1822–1891), U.S. Congressman
 Waldo P. Johnson (1817–1885), U.S. senator and Confederate congressman
 Waldo Kantor (born 1960), Argentine volleyball player
 Waldo K. Lyon (1914–1998), U.S. Navy physicist
 Waldo Machado  (born 1934), Brazilian former footballer
 Waldo McBurney (1902–2009), credited as "America's Oldest Worker"
 Waldo Ponce, Chilean football player
 Waldo de los Ríos (1934–1977), Argentine composer and conductor
 Waldo Salt (1914–1987), American screenwriter
 Waldo E. Sexton (1885–1967), American businessman
 Waldo Williams (1904–1971), Welsh language poet

Fictional characters
 Waldo, a central character in the Where's Wally? children's book series and television show
 Waldo, one of the Our Gang characters
 Waldo, a supporting character in the AMC series Into the Badlands
 "Waldo", nickname of the tourist guy in a 9/11 attack hoax photograph
 Waldo Faldo, a character from the television series Family Matters
 Waldo Farthingwaite-Jones, title character of "Waldo" (short story) by Robert A. Heinlein
 Waldo Jeffers, protagonist of The Velvet Underground song "The Gift"
 Waldo Jones, disabled inventor in Robert A. Heinlein's 1942 short story "Waldo"
 Waldo Kitty, a feline parody of Walter Mitty, from the animated series The Secret Lives of Waldo Kitty
 Waldo Magoo, the nephew of Quincy Magoo, from the Mr. Magoo franchise
 Waldo C. Graphic, a character from the theme park attraction Muppet*Vision 3D
 Waldo Pepper, title character of the film The Great Waldo Pepper
 Waldo Franz Schaeffer (more commonly known as Franz Hopper), a minor supporting character from the French animated television series Code Lyoko and its cancelled 2013 live-action/CGI show Code Lyoko: Evolution
 Uncle Waldo, the drunken gander from the 1970 Disney animated film The Aristocats
 Waldo, a Reptool in the television series Dinotrux

Masculine given names
English masculine given names
German masculine given names